Sibbald is a hamlet in southern Alberta, Canada within Special Area No. 3.

Climate 
Sibbald experiences a semi-arid climate (Köppen climate classification BSk). Winters are cold, while summers are warm to hot, and dry.

Demographics 
Sibbald recorded a population of 33 in the 1991 Census of Population conducted by Statistics Canada.

See also 
List of communities in Alberta
List of hamlets in Alberta

References 

Hamlets in Alberta
Special Area No. 3